Indented corners, known in Thai as yo mum, are a feature of traditional Thai architecture where the corners of a rectangular structure are broken up into multiple recessed corners. The most common form features three angles at each of the structure's four corners, and is referred to as twelve indented corners, or yo mum mai sip song. The form is featured extensively in the religious architecture of the late Ayutthaya period, and can be found in stupas (chedi), building columns, and the tiered spires of the prasat architectural form.

References

Architecture in Thailand
Traditional Thai architecture
Thai Buddhist art and architecture